The Andorra men's national under-18 basketball team is a national basketball team of Andorra, administered by the Andorran Basketball Federation. It represents the country in international men's under-18 basketball competitions.

The team won 8 medals at the FIBA U18 European Championship Division C.

FIBA U18 European Championship Division C record

See also
Andorra men's national basketball team
Andorra men's national under-16 basketball team
Andorra women's national under-18 basketball team

References

External links
Archived records of Andorra team participations

Basketball in Andorra
Basketball
Men's national under-18 basketball teams